Drum is the first release from art rock band Hugo Largo. It was produced by Michael Stipe (who also provides backing vocals on two of the tracks) and released by Brian Eno's record label, Opal Records, on January 1, 1988. It had originally been released by Relativity Records in shorter form as an EP in 1987. The Guardian included it in a list of "1000 Albums to Hear Before You Die" in 2007. It was released in the United Kingdom by Land Records, and reissued by All Saints Records in 2005.

Track listing
 "Grow Wild" (Mimi Goese, Adam Peacock, Hahn Rowe, Tim Sommer) - 3:46
 "Eskimo Song" (Goese, Peacock, Rowe, Sommer) - 3:42
 "Fancy" (Ray Davies) - 4:18
 "Harpers" (Goese, Stipe) - 2:22
 "Scream Tall" (Goese, Peacock, Rowe, Sommer) - 3:17
 "Country" (Goese, Peacock, Rowe, Sommer) - 3:42
 "Eureka" (Goese, Peacock, Rowe, Sommer) - 3:13
 "Second Skin" (Goese, Sommer) - 3:16
 "My Favourite People" (Goese) - 0:55

Notes
"Fancy" is a cover of a song first released by the Kinks on their album Face to Face.

References

1988 debut albums
Albums produced by Michael Stipe
All Saints Records albums